The University of Manchester is a public research university in Manchester, England. The main campus is south of Manchester City Centre on Oxford Road. The university owns and operates major cultural assets such as the Manchester Museum, The Whitworth art gallery, the John Rylands Library, the Tabley House Collection and the Jodrell Bank Observatory – a UNESCO World Heritage Site.

The University of Manchester is considered a red brick university, a product of the civic university movement of the late 19th century. The current University of Manchester was formed in 2004 following the merger of the University of Manchester Institute of Science and Technology (UMIST) and the Victoria University of Manchester. This followed a century of the two institutions working closely with one another.

The University of Manchester Institute of Science and Technology had its origins in the Mechanics' Institute, which was founded in 1824. The present University of Manchester considers this date, which is also the date of foundation of the Royal School of Medicine and Surgery, one of the predecessor institutions of the Victoria University of Manchester, as its official foundation year, as indicated in its crest and logo. The founders of the institute believed that all professions somewhat relied on scientific principles. As such, the institute taught working individuals branches of science applicable to their existing occupations. They believed that the practical application of science would encourage innovation and advancements within those trades and professions. The Victoria University of Manchester was founded in 1851, as Owens College. Academic research undertaken by the university was published via the Manchester University Press from 1904.

Manchester is the third-largest university in the United Kingdom by total enrolment and receives over 92,000 undergraduate applications per year, making it the most popular university in the UK by volume of applications. The University of Manchester is a member of the Russell Group, the N8 Group, and the US-based Universities Research Association. The University of Manchester, inclusive of its predecessor institutions, has had 25 Nobel laureates amongst its past and present students and staff, the fourth-highest number of any single university in the United Kingdom. In 2021/22, the university had a consolidated income of £1.2 billion, of which £270.6 million was from research grants and contracts (6th place nationally behind Oxford, University College London (UCL), Cambridge, Imperial and Edinburgh). The university has the seventh-largest endowment of any university in the UK.

History

Origins (1824 to 2004)

The University of Manchester traces its roots to the formation of the Mechanics' Institute (later UMIST) in 1824, and its heritage is linked to Manchester's pride in being the world's first industrial city. The English chemist John Dalton, together with Manchester businessmen and industrialists, established the Mechanics' Institute to ensure that workers could learn the basic principles of science.

John Owens, a textile merchant, left a bequest of £96,942 in 1846 (around £5.6 million in 2005 prices) to found a college to educate men on non-sectarian lines. His trustees established Owens College in 1851 in a house on the corner of Quay Street and Byrom Street which had been the home of the philanthropist Richard Cobden, and subsequently housed Manchester County Court. The locomotive designer Charles Beyer became a governor of the college and was the largest single donor to the college extension fund, which raised the money to move to a new site and construct the main building now known as the John Owens building. He also campaigned and helped fund the engineering chair, the first applied science department in the north of England. He left the college the equivalent of £10 million in his will in 1876, at a time when it was in great financial difficulty. Beyer funded the total cost of construction of the Beyer Building to house the biology and geology departments. His will also funded Engineering chairs and the Beyer Professor of Applied mathematics.

The university has a rich German heritage. The Owens College Extension Movement formed their plans after a tour of mainly German universities and polytechnics. A Manchester mill owner, Thomas Ashton, chairman of the extension movement, had studied at Heidelberg University. Sir Henry Roscoe also studied at Heidelberg under Robert Bunsen and they collaborated for many years on research projects. Roscoe promoted the German style of research-led teaching that became the role model for the red-brick universities. Charles Beyer studied at Dresden Academy Polytechnic. There were many Germans on the staff, including Carl Schorlemmer, Britain's first chair in organic chemistry, and Arthur Schuster, professor of physics. There was even a German chapel on the campus.

In 1873, Owens College moved to new premises on Oxford Road, Chorlton-on-Medlock, and from 1880 it was a constituent college of the federal Victoria University. This university was established and granted a royal charter in 1880, becoming England's first civic university; following Liverpool and Leeds becoming independent, it was renamed the Victoria University of Manchester in 1903 and absorbed Owens College the following year.

By 1905, the two institutions were large and active forces. The Municipal College of Technology, forerunner of UMIST, was the Victoria University of Manchester's Faculty of Technology while continuing in parallel as a technical college offering advanced courses of study. Although UMIST achieved independent university status in 1955, the universities continued to work together.  However, in the late-20th century, formal connections between the university and UMIST diminished and in 1994 most of the remaining institutional ties were severed as new legislation allowed UMIST to become an autonomous university with powers to award its own degrees. A decade later the development was reversed. The Victoria University of Manchester and the University of Manchester Institute of Science and Technology agreed to merge into a single institution in March 2003.

Before the merger, Victoria University of Manchester and UMIST counted 23 Nobel Prize winners amongst their former staff and students, with two further Nobel laureates being subsequently added. Manchester has traditionally been strong in the sciences; it is where the nuclear nature of the atom was discovered by Ernest Rutherford, and the world's first electronic stored-program computer was built at the university. Notable scientists associated with the university include physicists Ernest Rutherford, Osborne Reynolds, Niels Bohr, James Chadwick, Arthur Schuster, Hans Geiger, Ernest Marsden and Balfour Stewart. Contributions in other fields such as mathematics were made by Paul Erdős, Horace Lamb and Alan Turing and in philosophy by Samuel Alexander, Ludwig Wittgenstein and Alasdair MacIntyre. The author Anthony Burgess, Pritzker Prize and RIBA Stirling Prize-winning architect Norman Foster and composer Peter Maxwell Davies all attended, or worked at, Manchester.

Post-merger (2004 to present)

The current University of Manchester was officially launched on 1 October 2004 when Queen Elizabeth II bestowed its royal charter. The university was named the Sunday Times University of the Year in 2006 after winning the inaugural Times Higher Education Supplement University of the Year prize in 2005.

The founding president and vice-chancellor of the new university was Alan Gilbert, former vice-chancellor of the University of Melbourne, who retired at the end of the 2009–2010 academic year. His successor was Dame Nancy Rothwell, who had held a chair in physiology at the university since 1994. One of the university's aims stated in the Manchester 2015 Agenda is to be one of the top 25 universities in the world, following on from Alan Gilbert's aim to "establish it by 2015 among the 25 strongest research universities in the world on commonly accepted criteria of research excellence and performance". In 2011, four Nobel laureates were on its staff: Andre Geim, Konstantin Novoselov, Sir John Sulston and Joseph E. Stiglitz.

The EPSRC announced in February 2012 the formation of the National Graphene Institute. The University of Manchester is the "single supplier invited to submit a proposal for funding the new £45m institute, £38m of which will be provided by the government" – (EPSRC & Technology Strategy Board). In 2013, an additional £23 million of funding from European Regional Development Fund was awarded to the institute taking investment to £61 million.

In August 2012, it was announced that the university's Faculty of Engineering and Physical Sciences had been chosen to be the "hub" location for a new BP International Centre for Advanced Materials, as part of a $100 million initiative to create industry-changing materials. The centre will be aimed at advancing fundamental understanding and use of materials across a variety of oil and gas industrial applications and will be modelled on a hub and spoke structure, with the hub located at Manchester, and the spokes based at the University of Cambridge, Imperial College London, and the University of Illinois at Urbana–Champaign.

In 2020 the university saw a series of student rent strikes and protests in opposition to the university's handling of the COVID-19 pandemic, rent levels, and living conditions in the university's halls of residence. The protests ended with a negotiated rent reduction.

In 2023, a second rent strike and student protest in opposition to the university's rent price and living conditions in the halls of residence started.

Campus

The university's main site contains most of its facilities and is often referred to as the campus, however Manchester is not a campus university as the concept is commonly understood. It is centrally located in the city and its buildings are integrated into the fabric of Manchester, with non-university buildings and major roads between.

The campus occupies an area shaped roughly like a boot: the foot of which is aligned roughly south-west to north-east and is joined to the broader southern part of the boot by an area of overlap between former UMIST and former VUM buildings; it comprises two parts:
North campus or Sackville Street Campus, centred on Sackville Street in Manchester
South campus or Oxford Road Campus, centred on Oxford Road.
The names are not officially recognised by the university, but are commonly used, including in parts of its website and roughly correspond to the campuses of the old UMIST and Victoria University respectively.

There are other university buildings across the city and the wider region, such as Jodrell Bank Observatory in Cheshire and One Central Park in Moston, a collaboration between the university and other partners which offers office space for start-up firms and venues for conferences and workshops,

Major projects

Following the merger, the university embarked on a £600 million programme of capital investment, to deliver eight new buildings and 15 major refurbishment projects by 2010, partly financed by a sale of unused assets. These include:
 £60 m Flagship University Place building (new build)
 £56 m Alan Turing Building houses Mathematics, replaced Mathematics Tower. Home to the Photon Sciences Institute and the Jodrell Bank Centre for Astrophysics (new build)
 £50 m Life Sciences Research Building (A. V. Hill Building) (new build)
 £38 m Manchester Institute of Biotechnology (MIB) (new build)
 £33 m Life Sciences and Medical and Human Sciences Building (Michael Smith Building) (new build)
 £31 m Humanities Building – now officially called the "Arthur Lewis Building" (new build)
 £20 m Wolfson Molecular Imaging Centre (WMIC) (new build)
 £18 m Re-location of School of Pharmacy
 £17 m John Rylands Library, Deansgate (extension & refurbishment of existing building)
 £13 m Chemistry Building
 £10 m Functional Biology Building
 £350 m Manchester Engineering Campus Development (will be formally opened to students in September 2022, new build)

Old Quadrangle

The buildings around the Old Quadrangle date from the time of Owens College, and were designed in a Gothic style by Alfred Waterhouse and his son Paul Waterhouse. The first to be built was the John Owens Building (1873), formerly the Main Building; the others were added over the next thirty years. Today, the museum continues to occupy part of one side, including the tower. The grand setting of the Whitworth Hall is used for the conferment of degrees, and part of the old Christie Library (1898) now houses Christie's Bistro. The remainder of the buildings house administrative departments. The less easily accessed Rear Quadrangle, dating mostly from 1873, is older in its completed form than the Old Quadrangle.

Contact

Contact stages modern live performance for all ages, and participatory workshops primarily for young people aged 13 to 30. The building on Devas Street was completed in 1999 incorporating parts of its 1960s predecessor. It has a unique energy-efficient ventilation system, using its high towers to naturally ventilate the building without the use of air conditioning. The colourful and curvaceous interior houses three performance spaces, a lounge bar and Hot Air, a reactive public artwork in the foyer.

Other notable buildings
Other notable buildings in the Oxford Road Campus include the Stephen Joseph Studio, a former German Protestant church and the Samuel Alexander Building, a grade II listed building erected in 1919 and home of the School of Arts, Languages and Cultures.

In the Sackville Street Campus is the Sackville Street Building which was formerly UMIST's "Main Building". It was opened in 1902 by the then Prime Minister, Arthur Balfour. Built using Burmantofts terracotta, the building is now Grade II listed. It was extended along Whitworth Street, towards London Road, between 1927 and 1957 by the architects Bradshaw Gass & Hope, completion being delayed due to the depression in the 1930s and the Second World War.

Organisation and administration

Faculties and schools
The University of Manchester was divided into four faculties, but from 1 August 2016 it was restructured into three faculties, each sub-divided into schools.

On 25 June 2015, the University of Manchester announced the results of a review of the position of life sciences as a separate faculty. As a result of this review the Faculty of Life Sciences was to be dismantled, most of its personnel to be incorporated into a single medical/biological faculty, with a substantial minority being incorporated into a science and engineering faculty.

Faculty of Biology, Medicine and Health

The faculty is divided into the School of Biological Sciences, the School of Medical Sciences and the School of Health Sciences.

Biological Sciences have been taught at Manchester as far back as the foundation of Owens College in 1851. At UMIST, biological teaching and research began in 1959, with the creation of a Biochemistry department. The present school, though unitary for teaching, is divided into a number of sections for research purposes.

The medical college was established in 1874 and is one of the largest in the country, with more than 400 medical students trained in each clinical year and more than 350 students in the pre-clinical/phase 1 years. The university is a founding partner of the Manchester Academic Health Science Centre, established to focus high-end healthcare research in Greater Manchester. In November 2018, Expertscape recognized it as one of the top ten institutions worldwide in COPD research and treatment.

In 1883, a department of pharmacy was established at the university and, in 1904, Manchester became the first British university to offer an honours degree in the subject. The School of Pharmacy benefits from links with Manchester Royal Infirmary and Wythenshawe and Hope hospitals providing its undergraduate students with hospital experience.

Manchester Dental School was rated the country's best dental school by Times Higher Education in 2010 and 2011 and it is one of the best funded because of its emphasis on research and enquiry-based learning approach. The university has obtained multimillion-pound backing to maintain its high standard of dental education.

Faculty of Science and Engineering

The Faculty of Science and Engineering is divided into two schools. The School of Engineering comprises the departments of: Chemical Engineering and Analytical Science, Computer Science, Electrical and Electronic Engineering and Mechanical, Aerospace and Civil Engineering. The School of Natural Sciences comprises the departments of: Chemistry, Earth and Environmental Sciences, Physics and Astronomy, Materials and Mathematics.

The observatory's Lovell Telescope is named after Sir Bernard Lovell, a professor at the Victoria University of Manchester who first proposed the telescope. Constructed in the 1950s, it is the third largest fully movable radio telescope in the world. It has played an important role in the research of quasars, pulsars and gravitational lenses, and in confirming Einstein's theory of General Relativity.

Faculty of Humanities
The Faculty of Humanities includes the School of Arts, Languages and Cultures (incorporating Archaeology; Art History & Visual Studies; Classics and Ancient History; Drama; English and American Studies; History; Linguistics; Modern Languages; Museology; Music; Religions and Theology and the University Language Centre) and the Schools of Combined Studies; Education; Environment and Development; Architecture; Law; Social Sciences and the Manchester Business School. The Faculty of Humanities also jointly administers the Manchester School of Architecture (MSA) in conjunction with Manchester Metropolitan University and MSA students are classified as students of both universities.

Additionally, the faculty comprises a number of research institutes: the Centre for New Writing, the Institute for Social Change, the Brooks World Poverty Institute, Humanitarian and Conflict Response Institute, the Manchester Institute for Innovation Research, the Research Institute for Cosmopolitan Cultures, the Centre for Chinese Studies, the Institute for Development Policy and Management, the Centre for Equity in Education and the Sustainable Consumption Institute.

Professional services
A number of professional services, organised as "directorates", support the university. These include: Directorate of Compliance and Risk, Directorate of Estates and Facilities, Directorate of Finance, Directorate of Planning, Directorate of Human Resources, Directorate of IT Services, Directorate of Legal Affairs and Board Secretariat and Governance Office, Directorate of Research and Business Engagement, Directorate for the Student Experience, Division of Communications and Marketing, Division of Development and Alumni Relations, Office for Social Responsibility and the University Library. Additionally, professional services staff are found within the faculty structure, in such roles as technician and experimental officer.

Each directorate reports to the registrar, secretary and chief operating officer, who in turn reports to the president of the university. There is also a director of faculty operations in each faculty, overseeing support for these areas.

Finances
In the financial year ending 31 July 2011, the University of Manchester had a total income of £808.58 million (2009/10 – £787.9 million) and total expenditure of £754.51 million (2009/10 – £764.55 million). Key sources of income included £247.28 million from tuition fees and education contracts (2009/10 – £227.75 million), £203.22 million from funding body grants (2009/10 – £209.02 million), £196.24 million from research grants and contracts (2009/10 – £194.6 million) and £14.84 million from endowment and investment income (2009/10 – £11.38 million). During the 2010/11 financial year the University of Manchester had a capital expenditure of £57.42 million (2009/10 – £37.95 million).

At year end the University of Manchester had endowments of £158.7 million (2009/10 – £144.37 million) and total net assets of £731.66 million (2009/10 – £677.12 million).

Academic profile
The University of Manchester is the  largest university in the UK (following The Open University and University College London). The University of Manchester attracts international students from 160 countries around the world.

Well-known members of the university's current academic staff include computer scientist Steve Furber, economist Richard Nelson, novelist Jeanette Winterson and biochemist Sir John Sulston, Nobel Prize laureate of 2002.

Research
The University of Manchester is a major centre for research and a member of the Russell Group of leading British research universities. In the 2021 Research Excellence Framework, the university was ranked fifth in the UK in terms of research power and eighth for grade point average quality of staff submitted among multi-faculty institutions (tenth when including specialist institutions). In the 2014 Research Excellence Framework, the university was ranked fifth in the UK in terms of research power and fifteenth for grade point average quality of staff submitted among multi-faculty institutions (seventeenth when including specialist institutions). Manchester has the sixth largest research income of any English university (after Oxford, University College London (UCL), Cambridge, Imperial and King's College London), and has been informally referred to as part of a "golden diamond" of research-intensive UK institutions (adding Manchester to the Oxford–Cambridge–London "Golden Triangle"). Manchester has a strong record in terms of securing funding from the three main UK research councils, EPSRC, MRC and BBSRC, being ranked fifth, seventh and first respectively. In addition, the university is one of the richest in the UK in terms of income and interest from endowments: an estimate in 2008 placed it third, surpassed only by Oxford and Cambridge.

The University of Manchester has attracted the most research income from UK industry of any institution in the country. The figures, from the Higher Education Statistics Agency (HESA), show that Manchester attracted £24,831,000 of research income in 2016–2017 from UK industry, commerce and public corporations.

Historically, Manchester has been linked with high scientific achievement: the university and its constituent former institutions combined had 25 Nobel laureates among their students and staff, the third largest number of any single university in the United Kingdom (after Oxford and Cambridge) and the ninth largest of any university in Europe. Furthermore, according to an academic poll two of the top ten discoveries by university academics and researchers were made at the university (namely the first working computer and the contraceptive pill). The university currently employs four Nobel Prize winners amongst its staff, more than any other in the UK. The Langworthy Professorship, an endowed chair at the university's Department of Physics and Astronomy, has been historically given to a long line of academic luminaries, including Ernest Rutherford (1907–19), Lawrence Bragg (1919–37), Patrick Blackett (1937–53) and more recently Konstantin Novoselov, all of whom have won the Nobel Prize. In 2013 Manchester was given the Regius Professorship in Physics, the only one of its kind in the UK; the current holder is Andre Geim.

Libraries

The University of Manchester Library is the largest non-legal deposit library in the UK and the third-largest academic library after those of Oxford and Cambridge. It has the largest collection of electronic resources of any library in the UK.

The John Rylands Library, founded in memory of John Rylands by his wife Enriqueta Augustina Rylands as an independent institution, is situated in a Victorian Gothic building on Deansgate, in the city centre. It houses an important collection of historic books and other printed materials, manuscripts, including archives and papyri. The papyri are in ancient languages and include the oldest extant New Testament document, Rylands Library Papyrus P52, commonly known as the St John Fragment. In April 2007 the Deansgate site reopened to readers and the public after major improvements and renovations, including the construction of the pitched roof originally intended and a new wing.

Collections

Manchester Museum

The Manchester Museum holds nearly 4.25 million items sourced from many parts of the world. The collections include butterflies and carvings from India, birds and bark-cloth from the Pacific, live frogs and ancient pottery from America, fossils and native art from Australia, mammals and ancient Egyptian craftsmanship from Africa, plants, coins and minerals from Europe, art from past civilisations of the Mediterranean, and beetles, armour and archery from Asia. In November 2004, the museum acquired a cast of a fossilised Tyrannosaurus rex called "Stan".

The museum's first collections were assembled in 1821 by the Manchester Society of Natural History, and subsequently expanded by the addition of the collections of Manchester Geological Society. Due to the society's financial difficulties and on the advice of evolutionary biologist Thomas Huxley, Owens College accepted responsibility for the collections in 1867. The college commissioned Alfred Waterhouse, architect of London's Natural History Museum, to design a museum on a site in Oxford Road to house the collections for the benefit of students and the public. The Manchester Museum was opened to the public in 1888.

Whitworth Art Gallery

The Whitworth Art Gallery houses collections of internationally known British watercolours, textiles and wallpapers, modern and historic prints, drawings, paintings and sculpture. Its collection contains 31,000 items. A programme of temporary exhibitions runs throughout the year and the Mezzanine Court displays sculpture.

The gallery was founded by Robert Darbishire with a donation from Sir Joseph Whitworth in 1889, as The Whitworth Institute and Park. In 1959, the gallery became part of the Victoria University of Manchester. In October 1995, the Mezzanine Court in the centre of the building was opened. It was designed to display sculptures and won a RIBA regional award.

Rankings and reputation

According to the 2020 Graduate Market Review published by High Fliers, Manchester is the most targeted university by the top 100 graduate employers in the UK.

As of 2021, the University of Manchester has been recognised as the 27th best university in the world by QS. The university was ranked 6th nationally. The University of Manchester was ranked 36th in the Academic Ranking of World Universities 2020. It had the 5th highest ranking of UK universities on this list. In 2019, the university placed 4th nationally in Reuters' list of the World's Most Innovative Universities.

According to The Sunday Times in 2006, "Manchester has a formidable reputation spanning most disciplines, but most notably in the life sciences, engineering, humanities, economics, sociology and the social sciences". Manchester was given a prestigious award for Excellence and Innovation in the Arts by the Times Higher Education Awards 2010.

In 2017, the Alliance Manchester Business School was ranked 3rd in UK, 10th in Europe and 30th in the world by the Financial Times in its global MBA ranking.

However, while world rankings (such as QS, ARWU, THE) typically place the university within the top 10 in the UK, the university ranks slightly less favourably in national studies. 'The Complete University Guide 2022' ranked Manchester 13th out of universities in the UK, and ‘The Times/Sunday Times Good University Guide 2021' placed it at 18th. A 2016 poll voted Manchester as the third "most underrated university in the UK".

In 2022 The University of Manchester has been ranked at number 38 in the latest Academic Ranking of World Universities (ARWU) which ranks the world’s leading higher education institutions.

The annual rankings see Manchester retain its top ten status as the 6th best institution in the UK and 8th in Europe, according to the ARWU.

This year, more than 2500 institutions were scrutinized, and the best 1000 universities in the world are published. Overall, The United Kingdom has 63 Top 1000 universities, and 38 of them are listed in the Top 500, 8 are listed in the Top 100.

Deputy President and Deputy Vice-Chancellor, Professor Luke Georgiou, said: “The ranking tables, despite their limitations, give a consistent picture of The University of Manchester’s excellence in national and global terms.”

Manchester University Press

Manchester University Press is the university's academic publishing house. It publishes academic monographs, textbooks and journals, most of which are works from authors based elsewhere in the international academic community, and is the third-largest university press in England after Oxford University Press and Cambridge University Press.

Student life

Students' Union

The University of Manchester Students' Union is the representative body of students at the university and the UK's largest students' union. It was formed out of the merger between UMIST Students' Association and University of Manchester Union when the parent organisations UMIST and the Victoria University of Manchester merged on 1 October 2004.

Unlike many other students' unions in the UK, it does not have a president, but is run by an eight-member executive team who share joint responsibility.

Sport

The University of Manchester operates sports clubs through its athletics union while student societies are operated by the Students' Union.

The university has more than 80 health and fitness classes while over 3,000 students are members of the 44 various Athletic Union clubs. The sports societies vary widely in their level and scope. Many more popular sports operate several university teams and departmental teams which compete in leagues against other teams within the university. Teams include: badminton, lacrosse, korfball, dodgeball, field hockey, rugby league, rugby union, football, basketball, fencing, netball, squash, water polo, ultimate, and cricket.

The athletic union was formed at Owens College in 1885 from four clubs: rugby, lacrosse, cricket and tennis. In 1901 the women's athletic union was founded. In 1981 the two unions were amalgamated. After the acquisition of the Firs estate in Fallowfield a sports ground and pavilion were provided there. From 1940 the McDougall Centre in Burlington Street was also in use as a sports centre. Ron Hill, Rowena Sweatman, James Hickman, Cyril Holmes and Harry Whittle are former students who have achieved Olympic success.

The Manchester Aquatics Centre, the swimming pool used for the Manchester Commonwealth Games is on the campus and used for water sports. The main facilities used for sports are the Sugden Centre in Grosvenor Street, the Armitage Site near Owens Park and the Wythenshawe Sports Ground.

The university has achieved success in the BUCS (British University & College Sports) competitions, with its men's water polo 1st team winning the national championships (2009, 2010, 2011) under the tutelage of their coach Andy Howard. It was positioned in eighth place in the overall BUCS rankings for 2009/10

The university competes annually in 28 different sports against Leeds and Liverpool universities in the Christie Cup, which Manchester has won for seven consecutive years. The Christie Cup is an inter-university competition between Liverpool, Leeds and Manchester in numerous sports since 1886. After the Oxford and Cambridge rivalry, the Christie's Championships is the oldest Inter–University competition on the sporting calendar: the cup was a benefaction of Richard Copley Christie.

Every year elite sportsmen and sportswomen are selected for membership of the XXI Club, a society formed in 1932 to promote sporting excellence at the university. Most members have gained a Full Maroon for representing the university and many have excelled at a British Universities or National level. No more than 21 active members are allowed, each elected for up to three years (after graduating they become passive members).

An example of the university clubs is the lacrosse club which was founded in the season 1883–84 and in the following years won the North of England Flags twice and maintained its position among the leading English clubs. In 1885 it was one of the four founding clubs of the athletic union. The merging of Owens College with the university in 1904 affected the club by restricting the pool of players available for selection. However, when the English Universities Lacrosse Championship was set up in 1925–26 with five university teams the Manchester team won in the first season and again in 1932–33 and continued to do so in the 1930s.

University Challenge quiz programme
In the eight years up to 2013, Manchester has won the BBC2 quiz programme University Challenge four times, drawing equal with Magdalen College, Oxford, for the highest number of series wins. Since merging as the University of Manchester, the university has consistently reached the latter stages of the competition, progressing to at least the semi-finals every year since 2005.

In 2006, Manchester beat Trinity Hall, Cambridge, to record the university's first win in the competition. The next year, the university finished in second place after losing to the University of Warwick in the final. In 2009, the team battled hard in the final against Corpus Christi College, Oxford. At the gong, the score was 275 to 190 in favour of Corpus Christi College after a winning performance from Gail Trimble. However, the title was eventually given to the University of Manchester after it was discovered that Corpus Christi team member Sam Kay had graduated eight months before the final was broadcast, so the team was disqualified.

Manchester reached the semi-finals in the 2010 competition before being beaten by Emmanuel College, Cambridge. The university did not enter the 2011 series for an unknown reason. However, Manchester did enter a year later and won University Challenge 2012. Manchester has since defended its title to win University Challenge 2013, beating University College London, 190 to 140.

Student housing

Before they merged, the two former universities had for some time been sharing their residential facilities.

City Campus

Whitworth Park Halls of Residence is owned by the University of Manchester and houses 1,085 students, located next to Whitworth Park. It is notable for its triangular shaped accommodation blocks. Their designer took inspiration from a hill created from excavated soil which had been left in 1962 from an archaeological dig led by John Gater. A consequence of the triangular design was a reduced cost for the construction company. A deal struck between the university and Manchester City Council meant the council would pay for the roofs of all student residential buildings in the area. They were built in the mid-1970s.

The site of the halls was previously occupied by many small streets whose names have been preserved in the names of the halls. Grove House is an older building that has been used by the university for many different purposes over the last sixty years. Its first occupants in 1951 were the Appointments Board and the Manchester University Press. The shops in Thorncliffe Place were part of the same plan and include banks and a convenience store.
Notable people associated with the halls include Friedrich Engels, whose residence is commemorated by a blue plaque on Aberdeen House; the physicist Brian Cox; and Irene Khan, Secretary General of Amnesty International.

The former UMIST Campus has four halls of residence near to Sackville Street building (Weston, Lambert, Fairfield, and Wright Robinson). Chandos Hall, a former residence, has been closed prior to demolition.

Other residences include Vaughn House, once the home of the clergy serving the Church of the Holy Name, and George Kenyon Hall at University Place; Crawford House and Devonshire House adjacent to the Manchester Business School and Victoria Hall on Upper Brook Street.

Victoria Park Campus

The Victoria Park Campus has several halls of residence including St. Anselm Hall with Canterbury Court, Dalton-Ellis Hall, Hulme Hall (including Burkhardt House) and Opal Gardens Hall. Halls at Victoria Park are generally more traditional, and more likely to be catered.

Hulme Hall, which opened in 1887 in Plymouth Grove, is the oldest hall of residence at the university. It moved to its current site in Victoria Park in 1907.

Fallowfield Campus
The Owens Park group of halls with a landmark tower is at its centre, while Oak House is another hall of residence. Woolton Hall is next to Oak House. Allen Hall is a traditional hall near Ashburne Hall (Sheavyn House being annexed to Ashburne). Richmond Park is a recent addition to the campus, as well as Unsworth Park which opened in 2019.

Student body

More students apply to Manchester than to any other university in the country, with 79,925 UCAS main scheme applications for undergraduate courses in 2020.  Manchester had the 16th highest average entry qualification for undergraduates of any UK university in 2019, with new students averaging 165 UCAS points, equivalent to 3/8th of a grade below A*A*A* in A-level grades. In 2020, the university made offers to 59.7% of applicants, with 11.3% of applicants being accepted.

15.7% of Manchester's undergraduates are privately educated, the 23rd highest proportion amongst mainstream British universities.

Notable people

Many notable people have worked or studied at the University of Manchester, or its predecessor institutions, including 25 Nobel Prize laureates.

Some of the best-known scientists are: John Dalton (founder of modern atomic theory), Ernest Rutherford who proved the nuclear nature of the atom whilst working at Manchester, Ludwig Wittgenstein (considered one of the most significant philosophers of the 20th century, who studied for a doctorate in engineering), George E. Davis (founder of the discipline of chemical engineering), Alan Turing (a founder of computer science and AI, and notable figure in gay rights history), Marie Stopes (pioneer of birth control and campaigner for women's rights),  Bernard Lovell (a pioneer of radio astronomy), Tom Kilburn and Frederic Calland Williams (who developed the Manchester Baby, the world's first stored-program computer at Victoria University of Manchester in 1948), and physicist and television presenter Brian Cox.

Notable politicians and public figures associated with the university include: two current presidents - Michael D Higgins of the Republic of Ireland and Samia Suluhu Hassan of Tanzania - and two current prime ministers - Abdalla Hamdok of Sudan and Gaston Browne of Antigua and Barbuda - as well as several ministers in the United Kingdom, Malaysia, Canada, Hong Kong, and Singapore. Chaim Weizmann, a senior lecturer at the university, was the first president of Israel. Irene Khan is a former secretary general of Amnesty International).

In the arts, alumni include: the author Anthony Burgess and Robert Bolt (two times Academy Award winner and three times Golden Globe winner for writing the screenplay for Lawrence of Arabia and Doctor Zhivago).

A number of well-known actors have studied at the university, including Benedict Cumberbatch, who most notably portrays Doctor Strange in the Marvel Cinematic Universe, Sherlock Holmes in the TV series Sherlock, as well as playing the role of Manchester's own Alan Turing in the 2014 Oscar-winning biopic The Imitation Game.

The university also educated some of the leading figures of Alternative Comedy: Ben Elton, Ade Edmondson and Rik Mayall.

Nobel Prize winners 
The University of Manchester, inclusive of its predecessor institutions, numbers 25 Nobel Prize recipients amongst its current and former staff and students, with some of the most important discoveries of the modern age having been made in Manchester. Manchester University has the fourth largest number of Nobel laureates in the UK, only Cambridge, Oxford and UCL having a greater number.

Chemistry
 Ernest Rutherford (awarded Nobel Prize in 1908), for his investigations into the disintegration of the elements and the chemistry of radioactive substances.
 Arthur Harden (awarded Nobel Prize in 1929), for investigations on the fermentation of sugar and fermentative enzymes.
 Walter Haworth (awarded Nobel Prize in 1937), for his investigations on carbohydrates and vitamin C.
 George de Hevesy (awarded Nobel Prize in 1943), for his work on the use of isotopes as tracers in the study of chemical processes.
 Robert Robinson (awarded Nobel Prize in 1947), for his investigations on plant products of biological importance, especially the alkaloids.
 Alexander Todd (awarded Nobel Prize in 1957), for his work on nucleotides and nucleotide co-enzymes.
 Melvin Calvin (awarded Nobel Prize in 1961), for his research on the carbon dioxide assimilation in plants.
 John Charles Polanyi (awarded Nobel Prize in 1986), for his contributions concerning the dynamics of chemical elementary processes.
 Michael Smith (awarded Nobel Prize in 1993), for his fundamental contributions to the establishment of oligonucleotide-based, site-directed mutagenesis and its development for protein studies.

Physics
 Joseph John (J. J.) Thomson (awarded Nobel Prize in 1906), in recognition of his theoretical and experimental investigations on the conduction of electricity by gases.
 William Lawrence Bragg (awarded Nobel Prize in 1915), for his services in the analysis of crystal structure by means of X-rays.
 Niels Bohr (awarded Nobel Prize in 1922), for his fundamental contributions to understanding atomic structure and quantum mechanics.
 Charles Thomson Rees (C. T. R.) Wilson (awarded Nobel Prize in 1927), for his method of making the paths of electrically charged particles visible by condensation of vapour.
 James Chadwick (awarded Nobel Prize in 1935), for the discovery of the neutron.
 Patrick M. Blackett (awarded Nobel prize in 1948), for developing cloud chamber and confirming/discovering positron.
 Sir John Douglas Cockcroft (awarded Nobel Prize in 1951), for his pioneer work on the splitting of atomic nuclei by artificially accelerated atomic particles and also for his contribution to modern nuclear power.
 Hans Bethe (awarded Nobel Prize in 1967), for his contributions to the theory of nuclear reactions, especially his discoveries concerning the energy production in stars.
 Nevill Francis Mott (awarded Nobel Prize in 1977), for his fundamental theoretical investigations of the electronic structure of magnetic and disordered systems.
Andre Geim and Konstantin Novoselov (awarded Nobel Prize in 2010), for groundbreaking experiments regarding the two-dimensional material graphene.

Physiology and Medicine
 Archibald Vivian Hill (awarded Nobel Prize in 1922), for his discovery relating to the production of heat in muscle. One of the founders of the diverse disciplines of biophysics and operations research.
 Sir John Sulston (awarded Nobel Prize in 2002), for his discoveries concerning 'genetic regulation of organ development and programmed cell death'. In 2007, Sulston was announced as chair of the newly founded Institute for Science, Ethics and Innovation (iSEI) at the University of Manchester.

Economics
 John Hicks (awarded Nobel Prize in 1972), for his pioneering contributions to general economic equilibrium theory and welfare theory.
 Sir Arthur Lewis (awarded Nobel Prize in 1979), for his pioneering research into economic development research with particular consideration of the problems of developing countries.
 Joseph E. Stiglitz (awarded Nobel Prize in 2001), for his analyses of markets with asymmetric information. Currently heads the Brooks World Poverty Institute (BWPI) at the University of Manchester.

See also
 Third-oldest university in England debate

References

Further reading
 Powicke, Maurice. "University of Manchester." History Today (May 1951) 1#5 pp 48–55 online

External links

 
Russell Group
Educational institutions established in 2004
2004 establishments in England
Buildings and structures in Manchester
Culture in Manchester
Universities and colleges formed by merger in the United Kingdom
Universities UK